Agios Dimitrios is a village in the Ellispontos municipal unit, Kozani regional unit, Greece. It is situated at an elevation of 780 meters above sea level.  The Postal Code is 50100, and the Telephone code is +30 24610.
Near the village, there is the largest thermal power station of Greek.

References

Populated places in Kozani (regional unit)